The Mercer County Special Services School District (MCSSSD) is a special education public school district headquartered in Hamilton Township, in Mercer County, New Jersey, United States, whose schools offer educational and therapeutic services for students of elementary and high school age from across the county who have emotional of physical disabilities that cannot be addressed by their sending districts. The district was created in November 1977.

As of the 2011-12 school year, the district's four schools had an enrollment of 628 students and 103.8 classroom teachers (on an FTE basis), for a student–teacher ratio of 6.05:1.

The superintendent for the district is also the superintendent for the Mercer County Technical Schools.

Schools
Schools in the district (with 2018-19 enrollment data from the National Center for Education Statistics) are:
Joseph F. Cappello School (96; PreK-6)
Clara Bigos, Principal
Mercer Elementary School (191; 3-8)
Carline Mirthil, Principal

High School
Mercer High School (271; 9-12)
Brian Kozakowski, Principal
New Jersey Regional Day School at Hamilton (1; 9-12)
Brian Kozakowski, Principal

Administration
Core members of the district's administration are:
Matthew C. Carey, Superintendent
Kristen Taylor, Assistant Superintendent 
Tammy Lascar, Director of Student Services
Deborah Donnelly, Business Administrator / Board Secretary

References

External links

1977 establishments in New Jersey
School districts in Mercer County, New Jersey
Special schools in the United States
Hamilton Township, Mercer County, New Jersey
School districts established in 1977